Discomiosis is a genus of moths in the family Geometridae.

Species
 Discomiosis anfractilinea Prout, 1915
 Discomiosis crescentifera (Warren, 1902)
 Discomiosis synnephes Prout, 1915

Citations

References
 Discomiosis at Markku Savela's Lepidoptera and Some Other Life Forms
 Natural History Museum Lepidoptera genus database
 
 

Rhodostrophiini
Geometridae genera